The Couzon is a river in the Loire department of France, a tributary of the Gier, which in turn is a tributary of the Rhône. A dam on the river, built to serve as a reservoir for the Givors canal, now provides drinking water to the town of Rive-de-Gier.

Geography

It runs through the communes of Pavezin, Sainte-Croix-en-Jarez, Châteauneuf and Rive-de-Gier.
Tributaries are the Ruisseau Boissieux, Grand Valluy and Ruisseau de Chamerle.

Dam

In December 1788 King Louis XVI of France approved construction of a reservoir to supply water to the Givors canal in dry periods. 
François Zacharie, the canal's builder, had proposed a site for the reservoir high up near Saint-Étienne, but the chosen site was low down on the Couzon near Rive-de-Gier. 
This short-sighted decision ruled out the plan to continue the canal up to Saint-Etienne via the Janon and then down to the Loire. 
The French Revolution (1789–1799) delayed the work, but construction of the Barrage de Couzon (Couzon Dam) was completed in 1811.
The dam was operational by 1812.
It was formally inaugurated on 23 September 1814 by the Comte d'Artois.

The dam was modeled on the dam built at Saint-Ferriol for the Midi canal.
It has an unusual structure. Three parallel walls are interconnected by buttresses and form the central core.
Earth banks on each side of the wall provide strength.
Two tunnels run through the embankment at the deepest points. The lower one follows the original course of the river, and is used to remove silt from the reservoir.
The upper one has valves where it exits the reservoir.

Initially the dam was capable of containing  of water.
In 1880, when the canal company went bankrupt, the dam was converted into a source of drinking water for the inhabitants of Rive-de-Gier.
The water serves 95% of the municipality of Rive-de-Gier, part of Châteauneuf, and since 2005 St-Martin-le-Plain and St. Joseph. 
As of 2010 19,678 people relied on the dam for water, as well as various industrial users such as Industeel.

Other uses

Gallery

References
Citations

Sources

Rivers of France
Rivers of Loire (department)
Rivers of Auvergne-Rhône-Alpes